The Renault KJ was a compact car or small family car manufactured by Renault from 1923 until 1924.

Details and Evolutions

The Renault KJ was presented at the Mondial de l'Automobile in Paris in 1923, the project was created and designed by Louis Renault. A car of the medium social class, its competitors were the Peugeot Quadrilette and the Citroen Type C, the Renault KJ was available in a variety of body styles. After only a few months production the 'Coal Scuttle' bonnet was replaced with the new style 'Alligator' bonnet and the car was designated the KJ1.

Like almost all Renaults up until this time, the car used a cone based clutch, combined with a 3-speed manual transmission as on the old pre-war 10CV.  The brakes only affected the rear wheels. The prominent "gills" on the sides of the bonnet/hood reflected the positioning of the radiator behind the engine.

In 1924, Renault ceased production of this model and replaced it with the Renault MT which was similar but, amongst other minor modifications, was fitted with front wheel brakes.

Types

KJ1

Characteristics

Speed: 70 km/h
Power: 15HP (6CV)

KJ
Cars introduced in 1923